The European route E1 in the Republic of Ireland is a series of roads, part of the International E-road network running in a north south axis on the Irish east coast. It runs through five counties starting on the British border with the province of Northern Ireland at Dundalk, coming from Belfast and Larne. It passes the capital Dublin until it stops at Rosslare Harbour in the South-East of the island of Ireland. From there the E1 crosses the Celtic Sea and the Bay of Biscay on a non-existent ferry towards Spain and Portugal.

Route 
The E1 comes from Northern Ireland when it crosses the border at Dundalk where the British A1 road changes to the Irish N1 road until northern Dundalk. It then follows the M1 motorway to Drogheda and eventually the capital Dublin. After using the M50 ring road around Dublin, the E1 uses the N11 road and M11 motorway passing Bray, Wicklow, Gorey and Enniscorthy to Wexford. The last part is the N25 road towards Rosslare Harbour. The E1 covers a total distance of 266 km (165 mi) in the Republic of Ireland.

Detailed route

References

Road infrastructure in Ireland
European routes in Ireland